The Cabinet of Madagascar is the executive in the Government of Madagascar.

List 

 Andrianarivo government
 Mahafaly government
 Ntsay government
 First Rabemananjara government
 Second Rabemananjara government
 Third Rabemananjara government
 Sulla government

References 

Government of Madagascar
Madagascar